Nick Pollotta (August 26, 1954 – April 13, 2013 in Chicago) was an American author. He is best known for his humorous novels, including the science-fiction novel, Illegal Aliens (with Phil Foglio) and the fantasy novels Bureau 13 and That Darn Squid God (with James Clay). The majority of his work was published by Gold Eagle Books under house names "James Axler" and "Don Pendleton."

A former stand-up comic, he lived in Chicago with his wife Melissa. He was survived by his wife and three sons.

Bibliography

1989
 Illegal Aliens, SF/Humor, Nick Pollotta and Phil Foglio, TSR BOOKS

1990
 Bureau 13, Fantasy/Humor, Nick Pollotta, Ace Books

1991
 Doomsday Exam, Fantasy/Humor, Nick Pollotta, Ace Books
 Full Moonster, Fantasy/Humor, Nick Pollotta, Ace Books

1993
 Satellite Night News, SF/Humor, (as Jack Hopkins), Ace Books
 Satellite Night Special, SF/Humor, (as Jack Hopkins), Ace Books
 Satellite Night Fever, SF/Humor, (as Jack Hopkins), Ace Books

1994
 Illegal Aliens, SF/Humor, Nick Pollotta & Phil Foglio, Armada Press, Russia (translation)

1995
 Bureau 13 Omnibus, Fantasy/Humor, Nick Pollotta, Armada Press, RUSSIA (translation) 
 American Knights, YA/SF, Nick Pollotta, TSR Books
 The 24-Hour War, YA/SF, Nick Pollotta, TSR Books
 Freed-For-All, YA/SF, Nick Pollotta, TSR Books
 The Guardians of Cascade, Fantasy/Humor, Nick Pollotta, TSR Books

1997
 Shadowboxer, Science Fiction, Nicholas Pollotta, ROC Books

1999
 Gemini Rising, Action/Adventure (as James Axler), Gold Eagle Books, 1999

2000
 Gaia's Demise, Action/Adventure (as James Axler), Gold Eagle Books
 Dark Reckoning, Action/Adventure (as James Axler), Gold Eagle Books
 Pandora's Redoubt, Action/Adventure (as James Axler), Gold Eagle Books

2001
 Zero City, Action/Adventure (as James Axler), Gold Eagle Books
 Savage Armada, Action/Adventure (as James Axler), Gold Eagle Books
 Judas Strike, Action/Adventure (as James Axler), Gold Eagle Books
 Shadow Fortress, Action/Adventure (as James Axler), Gold Eagle Books

2002
 Sky Killers, Action/Adventure, (as Don Pendleton) Gold Eagle Books
 Deep Rampage, Action/Adventure, (as Don Pendleton), Gold Eagle Books

2003
 Devil Riders, Action/Adventure (as James Axler), Gold Eagle Books

2004
 Blood Fire, Action/Adventure (as James Axler), Gold Eagle Books
 Sky Baron, Action/Adventure, (as James Axler), Gold Eagle Books
 Stolen Arrows, Action/Adventure, (as Don Pendleton), Gold Eagle Books
 The Chameleon Factor, Action/Adventure, (as Don Pendleton), Gold Eagle Books
 Pandora's Redoubt, Action/Adventure, (as James Axler) Cutting Audio, audio book
 Zero City, Action/Adventure, (as James Axler) Cutting Audio, audio book
 Gemini Rising, Action/Adventure, (as James Axler) Cutting Audio, audio book
 Dark Reckoning, Action/Adventure, (as James Axler) Cutting Audio, audio book
 Gaia's Demise, Action/Adventure, (as James Axler) Cutting Audio, audio book
 That Darn Squid God, Fantasy/Humor, Nick Pollotta & James Clay, Wildside Press

2005
 Shatterzone, Action/Adventure, (as James Axler), Gold Eagle Books
 Savage Armada, Action/Adventure, (as James Axler) Cutting Audio, audio book
 Judas Strike, Action/Adventure, (as James Axler) Cutting Audio, audio book
 Shadow Fortress, Action/Adventure, (as James Axler) Cutting Audio, audio book
 The Chameleon Factor, Action/Adventure, (as Don Pendleton) Cutting Audio, audio book
 Bloodfire, Action/Adventure, (as James Axler) Cutting Audio, audio book
 Devil Riders, Action/Adventure, (as James Axler) Cutting Audio, audio book

2006
 Coldfire, Action/Adventure, (as James Axler), Gold Eagle Books
 Act of War, Action/Adventure, (as Don Pendleton), Gold Eagle Books
 Perdition Valley, Action/Adventure (as James Axler) Cutting Audio, audio book

2007
 Uplink, Action/Adventure, (as Don Pendleton), Gold Eagle Books
 Neutron Force, Action/Adventure, (as Don Pendleton), Gold Eagle Books
 Desert King, Action/Adventure, (as James Axler), Gold Eagle Books
 Shatterzone, Action/Adventure (as James Axler) Cutting Audio, audio book
 Sky Hammer, Action/Adventure (as Don Pendleton), Cutting Audio, audio book
 Illegal Aliens, SF/Humor, Nick Pollotta & Phil Foglio, AST Press, Russia (translation)
 That Darn Squid God, Fantasy/Humor, Nick Pollotta & James Clay, AST Press, Russia (translation)

2008
 Terror Descending, Action/Adventure, (as Don Pendleton), Gold Eagle Books
 Eden's Twilight, Action/Adventure, (as James Axler), Gold Eagle Books
 Capital Offense, Action/Adventure, (as James Axler), Gold Eagle Books

2009
 Last Days, Action/Adventure, (as Don Pendleton), Gold Eagle Books
 Airwolf, Action/Adventure, (as Don Pendleton), Gold Eagle Books
 Time Castaways, Action/Adventure, (as Don Pendleton), Gold Eagle Books
 Illegal Aliens SF/Humor, Nick Pollotta & Phil Foglio, Wildside Press

2010
 Moonfeast, Action/Adventure, (as James Axler), Gold Eagle Books
 Blood Chains, Action/Adventure, (as James Axler), Gold Eagle Books
 Damned Nation, Dark Fantasy, Nick Pollotta, Wildside Press

2011
 Prodigal Return, Action/Adventure, (as James Axler), Gold Eagle Books
 Dragonfire, Action/Adventure (as Don Pendleton), Gold Eagle Books

2012
 Belle, Book and Candle, Paranormal Romance, Nick Pollotta, Double Dragon Press
 Shadow Strike, Action/Adventure (as Don Pendleton), Gold Eagle Books
 Fireburst, Action/Adventure (as Don Pendleton), Gold Eagle Books 
 Oblivion Pact, Action/Adventure (as Don Pendleton), Gold Eagle Books

2013
 Sins of Honor, Action/Adventure (as James Axler), Gold Eagle Books

2014
 Pirate Offensive, Action/Adventure (as Don Pendelton), Gold Eagle Books

References

External links
Nick Pollotta

Obituary

1954 births
2013 deaths
20th-century American novelists
21st-century American novelists
American male novelists
American humorists
American science fiction writers
People from New Jersey
Deaths from cancer in Illinois
20th-century American male writers
21st-century American male writers